The Taichung City Dadun Cultural Center (also Da Dun Cultural Center) is a cultural center in West District, Taichung, Taiwan.

Organizational structure
The organization of the center has the following structure:
 Promotion section
 Exhibition and performance
 Section
 Library section
 General affairs section
 Personnel clerk
 Accountant

Architecture
The building is a five-story building. It consists of Da Dun gallery, exhibition rooms, document room, periodical room, children's room, reading room, open stack library, reference room, auditorium, conference room, training classroom, dance studio and music classroom.

See also
 List of museums in Taiwan

References

External links

 

Year of establishment missing
Cultural centers in Taichung